Viola epipsila, the dwarf marsh violet, is a species of perennial forb in the genus Viola.

It is found in Alaska, Finland, Russia, Poland, and other countries in Europe. Since the 1980s, it has spread to the eastern United States.

References

External links

epipsila
Edible plants
Flora of Europe
Flora of Finland
Flora of Russia